Pearson is an American political drama television series created by Aaron Korsh and Daniel Arkin that premiered on USA Network. It is a spin-off of the show Suits and stars Gina Torres, who reprises her role of Jessica Pearson. It premiered on July 17, 2019. In October 2019, the series was canceled after one season.

Premise
Pearson follows "powerhouse lawyer Jessica Pearson, as she enters the dirty world of Chicago politics."

Cast and characters

Episodes

Backdoor pilot (2018)

For the backdoor pilot, "No. overall" and "No. in season" refer to the episode's place in the order of episodes of the parent series Suits.

Season 1 (2019)

Production

Development
On February 22, 2017, it was announced that USA Network was developing a spin-off series of their show Suits set to star Gina Torres as her character Jessica Pearson. The spin-off had been talked about for about a year and a half prior to the announcement. Meetings and negotiations were reportedly in the preliminary stages with no deals with cast and crew members yet in place. The series was expected to be written by Suits creator and showrunner, Aaron Korsh, who was also expected to executive and showrun the potential new series. Production companies involved with the potential series were expected to include Universal Cable Productions. On March 1, 2017, it was reported that Gina Torres had signed a deal to produce the series, based on an idea she pitched to Universal Cable Productions, alongside Aaron Korsh.

On August 16, 2017, it was announced that the season seven finale of Suits would serve as a backdoor pilot to the spin-off series. The episode was expected to be written by Aaron Korsh and Daniel Arkin, and be directed by Anton Cropper. Additionally, it was reported that executive producers for the new series would include Korsh, Arkin, Torres, Doug Liman, David Bartis, and Gene Klein. On March 8, 2018, it was reported that USA Network had given the production a series order. On May 14, 2018, Gina Torres announced at NBCUniversal's annual upfront presentation in New York City that the series would be titled Second City. On January 17, 2019, it was announced that the series had been retitled Pearson. On May 1, 2019, it was reported that the series would premiere on July 17, 2019. On November 1, 2019, the USA Network canceled the series after one season.

Casting
Alongside the report of her hiring as producer, it was confirmed in March 2017 that Gina Torres would officially star in the potential series. On November 10, 2017, it was announced that Rebecca Rittenhouse and Morgan Spector had joined the main cast of the series. On September 20, 2018, it was reported that Rittenhouse's role had been recast with Bethany Joy Lenz assuming the part. Additionally, it was further announced that Chantel Riley would reprise her guest role from the backdoor pilot in a series regular capacity and that Isabel Arraiza and Eli Goree had been cast in main roles as well.

Filming
Principal photography for the series commenced on September 20, 2018, in Los Angeles, California. Filming took place in Chicago, Illinois during the week of October 15, 2018 with locations including the Chicago Cultural Center, Grant Park, Chicago City Hall, Millennium Park, and The Loop.

Reception

Critical response
On the review aggregation website Rotten Tomatoes, the series has an approval rating of 72% with an average rating of 6.92/10, based on 18 reviews. The website's critical consensus reads, "Though Pearson trades the juicy intrigue of Suits for straightforward political drama, it works thanks to Gina Torres's commanding performance." Metacritic, which uses a weighted average, assigned a score of 54 out of 100, based on 7 critics, indicating "mixed or average reviews".

Ratings

References

External links
 
 

2010s American drama television series
2010s American legal television series
2010s American political television series
2019 American television series debuts
2019 American television series endings
American legal drama television series
American television spin-offs
English-language television shows
Suits (American TV series)
Television series by Universal Content Productions
Television shows set in Chicago
USA Network original programming